The 2007–08 Moldovan Cup was the 17th season of the Moldovan annual football cup competition. The competition started on 19 August 2007 with the preliminary round and ended with the final held on 20 May 2008.

Preliminary round
14 teams entered this round. The games were played on 19 August 2007.

|}

First round
The seven winners from the previous round entered this round, in addition to 13 new teams. The games were played on 26 August 2007.

|}

Second round
The ten winners from the previous round entered this round, in addition to Academia, CSCA-Steaua, Dinamo, Floreni, Iskra-Stal and Rapid. The games were played on 6 September 2007.

|}

Round of 16
The eight winners from the previous round entered this round, in addition to Dacia, Nistru, Olimpia, Politehnica, Sheriff, Tiligul-Tiras, Tiraspol and Zimbru. The games were played on 7 and 8 October 2007.

|}

Quarter-finals
The first legs were played on 25 October 2007. The second legs were played on 7 November 2007.

|}

Semi-finals
The first legs were played on 16 April 2008. The second legs were played on 7 May 2008.

|}

Final

References
 
 

Moldovan Cup seasons
Moldovan Cup
Moldova